Sprotborough (SYR) railway station was situated on the South Yorkshire Railway's line between Doncaster Cherry Tree Lane and Conisbrough. The station was intended to serve both Sprotbrough and Warmsworth, near Doncaster, South Yorkshire, England.

The station was located where the Warmsworth to Sprotbrough road crosses the line over the deep limestone cutting and was approached by a covered flight of 66 steps to the Sheffield-bound platform. The station had two flanking platforms and a small wooden shelter which served as both ticket office and waiting room. Following the closure of the station on 1 January 1875 this structure served as a platelayers hut until the mid-1950s.

Worthy of note, the station incorrectly spelled the name of the village with an extra 'o'; the village is spelled Sprotbrough.

References 

The South Yorkshire Railway, D.L.Franks, Turntable Enterprises, 1971. 

Disused railway stations in Doncaster
Railway stations in Great Britain opened in 1850
Railway stations in Great Britain closed in 1875
Former South Yorkshire Railway stations